The Schultz Nucleon is an American high-wing strut-braced, single-seat glider that was designed and constructed by Arthur B. Schultz.

Design and development
The Nucleon was built by Schultz in 1954 and even though the wing was strut-braced the aircraft introduced some innovative construction techniques. The wing was carved from Styrofoam around its spar and then covered in fiberglass for a skin. The wing uses a NACA 65-415 airfoil, has full-span flaps and drooping ailerons, and is braced with a single faired strut. The strut-braced tailplane folds so that the aircraft can be loaded for ground transportation on a trailer.

Only one Nucleon was built and it is registered in the Experimental - amateur-built category.

Operational history
The aircraft was flown in the 1956 US Nationals and completed several  cross country flights.

In June 2011, 57 years after the aircraft was built, it was still on the US Federal Aviation Administration registry, listed as being subject to a sale.

Specifications (Nucleon)

See also

References

External links
The Nucleon on the cover of Soaring magazine, Jan/Feb 1953

1950s United States sailplanes
Homebuilt aircraft
Aircraft first flown in 1954